The 2021 Mexico City Grand Prix (officially known as the Formula 1 Gran Premio de la Ciudad de México 2021) was a Formula One motor race, held on 7 November 2021 at the Autódromo Hermanos Rodríguez in Mexico City. The race was the 18th round of the 2021 Formula One World Championship and marked the 21st edition of the Mexican Grand Prix, which was run under the name Mexico City Grand Prix for the first time, acknowledging the sponsorship support of the government of Mexico City.

The race was won by Max Verstappen followed by Lewis Hamilton and Sergio Pérez.

Background

The race marked its debut in the Formula One Championship calendar under the name Mexico City Grand Prix. The edition was called off due to the COVID-19 pandemic. The  race was originally to take place on 31 October, but was moved a week later due to the reduction of the overall number of Grands Prix in the calendar, from 23 to 22. This was the twenty-first World Championship Grand Prix held in Mexico.

Championship standings before the race 
After winning in the preceding United States Grand Prix, Max Verstappen led the Drivers' Championship by 12 points: Verstappen with 287.5 and Lewis Hamilton with 275.5. Behind them, Valtteri Bottas was in third place with 185 points. Sergio Pérez trailed him by 35 points, and Lando Norris trailed Pérez by 1 point. In the Constructors' Championship, Mercedes led Red Bull Racing by 23 points. Behind them, third-placed McLaren led fourth-placed Ferrari by 4.5 points with 254 points, with Alpine a distant fifth with 104 points.

Entrants 

The drivers and teams were the same as the season entry list with no additional stand-in drivers for the race.

Tyre choices 
Sole tyre supplier Pirelli allocated the C2, C3, and C4 compounds of tyre to be used in the race.

Practice
The weekend featured three practice sessions, each lasting one hour. The first practice session started at 11:30 local time (UTC−06:00) on 5 November, and ended with Valtteri Bottas fastest for Mercedes, ahead of teammate Lewis Hamilton and Red Bull driver Max Verstappen. The second practice session started at 15:00 local time, also on 5 November, and ended with Verstappen fastest ahead of Bottas and Hamilton. The third and final practice session started at 11:00 on 6 November with the Red Bulls of Sergio Pérez and Verstappen fastest, followed by the two Mercedes.

Qualifying 
Qualifying started at 14:00 local time on 6 November.

Qualifying classification 

Notes
  – Yuki Tsunoda was required to start the race from the back of the grid for exceeding his quota of power unit elements.
  – Lando Norris was required to start the race from the back of the grid for exceeding his quota of power unit elements.
  – George Russell received a five-place grid penalty for an unscheduled gearbox change.
  – Esteban Ocon was required to start the race from the back of the grid for exceeding his quota of power unit elements.
  – Lance Stroll was required to start the race from the back of the grid for exceeding his quota of power unit elements. He also received a five-place grid penalty for an unscheduled gearbox change. The penalty made no difference as he was already due to start from the last position.

Race 
The race started at 13:00 local time on 7 November. Valtteri Bottas started the race from pole position but was overtaken at the first corner by Max Verstappen. Bottas was then hit by Daniel Ricciardo from behind at the next corner with the stewards deciding neither driver was to blame for the incident. This put both drivers at the back of the field with neither scoring any points at this race. 

Max Verstappen was leading most the race with Sergio Perez taking the lead for a short while, during the period that Verstappen had pitted and he hadn’t. Perez became the first Mexican driver to lead his home Grand Prix. Lewis Hamilton was in second with Verstappen having a clear lead over him. Hamilton and Perez were close towards the end with Perez not far from trying to get past him. Hamilton managed to keep second place and Perez came home to finish third. By finishing 3rd, Pérez became the first Mexican driver to get a podium at home.

Valtteri Bottas took the fastest lap of the race, but did not receive the point for it as he finished outside the top ten. In line with the regulations, the fastest lap point was not redistributed.

Race classification

Championship standings after the race

Drivers' Championship standings

Constructors' Championship standings

 Note: Only the top five positions are included for both sets of standings.
 Bold text indicates competitors who still had a theoretical chance of becoming World Champion.

Notes

References

External links 

Mexico City
2021 in Mexico
November 2021 sports events in Mexico
Mexican Grand Prix